Long Valley, California may refer to several places:
Long Valley, Lassen County, California
Long Valley Caldera, a depression in eastern California adjacent to Mammoth Mountain
Long Valley, California, former name of Greenwood, El Dorado County, California